Jane Clark (born 1954; Jane) is an American author of two series of suspense novels. Her first twelve books are media thrillers influenced by her three decades of experience in broadcast journalism. She plots murder mysteries investigated and solved by the characters who work at KEY News, the fictional television news world she has created. Her next series is The Wedding Cake Mysteries, featuring an actress-turned wedding cake designer who gets involved in murder cases which threaten to prevent ceremonies.

Early life
The daughter of a special agent with the FBI who uncovered Russian espionage during the Cold War and, later, worked on kidnapping and extortion cases, her interest in suspense started at an early age. She attended Immaculate Heart Academy in Washington Township, Bergen County, New Jersey, graduating in 1972. With the goal of working in television news, she graduated from the University of Rhode Island with degrees in journalism and political science.

She started her professional career as a desk assistant at CBS News headquarters in New York City, eventually becoming a producer and writer.

Present
Clark resides in Hillsdale, New Jersey and Florida. She has two children, a daughter, Elizabeth, an actress, and a son, David who has Fragile X Syndrome, the most common inherited form of developmental disability. Mary Jane supports the FRAXA Research Foundation, a non-profit organization that supports scientific research aimed at finding a treatment or a cure for the condition.

Clark's former mother-in-law and sister-in-law are the well-known American authors Mary and Carol Higgins Clark, respectively.

Books

Key News

 1998 Do You Want to Know a Secret
 1999 Do You Promise Not to Tell
 2000 Let Me Whisper in Your Ear
 2001 Close To You
 2002 Nobody Knows
 2003 Nowhere to Run
 2004 Hide Yourself Away
 2005 Dancing in the Dark
 2006 Lights Out Tonight
 2007 When Day Breaks
 2008 It Only Takes a Moment
 2009 Dying for Mercy

Wedding Cake Mysteries

 2011 To Have and To Kill
 2012 The Look of Love
 2013 Footprints in the Sand
 2014 That Old Black Magic

References

External links
 Mary Jane Clark Official Website
 Book Reporter Interview
 Authors on the Air

1954 births
Living people
20th-century American novelists
American mystery writers
American thriller writers
Immaculate Heart Academy alumni
People from Hillsdale, New Jersey
University of Rhode Island alumni
Novelists from New Jersey
Novelists from New York (state)
21st-century American novelists
American women novelists
20th-century American women writers
Date of birth missing (living people)
21st-century American women writers
Women thriller writers
Women mystery writers